Hummer Creek is a  long 2nd order tributary to Thompson Creek in Crawford County, Pennsylvania.

Variant names
According to the Geographic Names Information System, it has also been known historically as:
Hummer Run

Course
Hummer Creek rises about 2 miles east-southeast of Vrooman, Pennsylvania and then flows southwest to join Thompson Creek at Shelmandine Springs.

Watershed
Hummer Creek drains  of area, receives about 45.1 in/year of precipitation, has a wetness index of 459.72, and is about 54% forested.

See also
 List of rivers of Pennsylvania

References

Additional Maps

Rivers of Pennsylvania
Rivers of Crawford County, Pennsylvania